Rakhi Pancholi (born 1977/1978) is a Canadian politician who was elected in the 2019 Alberta general election to the Legislative Assembly of Alberta representing the electoral district of Edmonton-Whitemud. Born to Tanzanian and Indian parents, she is a lawyer in Edmonton with a focus on education law.

Personal life 
Pancholi was a practising lawyer in Edmonton with a focus on labour/employment and education law. She has experience working with the Alberta School Boards Association and was a senior legislative consultant for Alberta Education. Pancholi has two young children with her husband Owen, and have two rescue dogs as they are both advocates for animal rescue and adoption.

Electoral history

2019 general election

References

Alberta New Democratic Party MLAs
Living people
Politicians from Edmonton
Women MLAs in Alberta
21st-century Canadian politicians
Year of birth missing (living people)
Lawyers in Alberta
Canadian women lawyers
Canadian politicians of Indian descent
21st-century Canadian women politicians